The 2014–15 Oregon Ducks men's basketball team represented the University of Oregon during the 2014–15 NCAA Division I men's basketball season. The Ducks were led by their fifth year head coach Dana Altman. They played their home games at Matthew Knight Arena and were members of the Pac-12 Conference. They finished the season 26–10, 13–5 in Pac-12 play to finish in a tie for second place. They advanced to the championship game of the Pac-12 tournament where they lost to Arizona. They received an at-large bid to the NCAA tournament where they defeated Oklahoma State in the second round before losing in the third round to Wisconsin.

Previous season
The 2013–14 Oregon Ducks finished the season with a record of 24–10 after advancing to the 2014 NCAA Division I men's basketball tournament. The team went 10–8 in the Pac-12 regular season. In the 2014 Pac-12 tournament, the team defeated Oregon State 88–74, before losing to UCLA, 63–82 in the quarterfinals. The Ducks were a #7-seed in the West Region of the NCAA tournament. Oregon won its first tournament game, defeating #10-seed BYU 87–68. Oregon eventually lost to #2-seed Wisconsin 77–85, in the Round of 32.

Off-season

Departures

Incoming transfers

2014 recruiting class

2015 recruiting class

Roster

Roster Notes
On January 6, 2015, Oregon added Freshman forward Roman Sorkin from the Israeli Junior National Team. He is eligible to play immediately.

Schedule
 
|-
!colspan=12 style="background:#004F27; color:yellow;"| Exhibition

|-
!colspan=12 style="background:#004F27; color:yellow;"| Non-conference regular season

|-
!colspan=12 style="background:#004F27;"| Pac-12 regular season

|-
!colspan=12 style="background:#004F27;"| Pac-12 tournament

|-
!colspan=12 style="background:#004F27;"| NCAA tournament

Ranking movement

References

Oregon Ducks men's basketball seasons
Oregon
Oregon
Oregon
Oregon